Giorgos Margaritis (born 20 June 1991) is a Greek footballer who plays as a left back.

References

External links 

Myplayer.gr Profile
Profile at epae.org

1983 births
Living people
Greek footballers
PAS Giannina F.C. players
Anagennisi Karditsa F.C. players
Aris Thessaloniki F.C. players
Olympiacos Volos F.C. players
Kavala F.C. players
Association football fullbacks
Footballers from Thessaloniki